The Arab Fashion Council (AFC) (Arabic: مجلس الأزياء العربي ) is the world's largest non-profit fashion council and an INGO for the Arab world, representing the 22 members of the Arab League. It is based in Dubai with the main goal to promote Arab fashion designers internationally, disseminate fashion culture in the region, and position the Arab world on the international map of fashion. It includes Arab companies and talent within the fashion industry, in particular fashion designers, models, photographers, hair stylists, make-up artists, and art directors. Likewise, it regulates the modelling agencies by creating standards to protect models working in the Arab world. Finally, it regulates the schools of fashion registered under the laws of Arab countries.

Its first Honorary President was Cav. Lav. Mario Boselli the former president of Camera Nazionale della Moda Italiana. On 18 December 2017, the Arab Fashion Council has announced from London the opening of its office in Riyadh and organised the first fashion week in the history of the Kingdom of Saudi Arabia under the name of Arab Fashion Week.

On 7 December 2015, Jacob Abrian has been elected as chief executive officer for the council, being the youngest appointed CEO for a Council.

In September 2017, the Arab Fashion Council has signed a strategic long-term partnership with Meraas, a Dubai-based holding company. that aims to position Dubai as a fashion capital and celebrate the Arab Fashion Week in a citywide activation in the emirate.

In April 2018, the Arab Fashion Council has signed a partnership with MBM Holding, a Dubai-based Royal family office and investment holding company with activities in investments, strategic advisory and social and community development.

A 2021 partnership with the Federation de la Haute Couture et de la Mode yielded the first ever Arab Fashion Week for Men, a three-day virtual event based in Dubai. The event is scheduled to occur twice annually in coordination with other men's fashion week events.

Vision
The Arab Fashion Council sets its 2030 vision aiming to create an Arab economy based on creativity and knowledge, by building an industry infrastructure in the region known as the Arab Fashion System. This system anticipates to divide the Arab countries into 3 main clusters; the North African Arab countries to fit under the raw materials resourcing and textile cluster, the Arab Levant countries under the manufacturing cluster, and the Arab countries of the Persian Gulf countries under the retail and merchandise cluster.

Structure
Based in Dubai, the Arab Fashion Council operates through partnerships in the entire region, its structure is based on 4 main pillars gon]] represented by a different department.

– Higher Management is formed from the board of Chief Officers, directors, and managers having the duty of running the daily business of the council.

– Advisors is formed out of nominated individuals to support the higher management in their strategic decisions and planning.

– Honorary Pioneers are those public notable figures whose work has given the important contribution to the civil society, charity, and the Fashion industry. Among the pioneers are Ralph Debbas the founder of W Motors, Marc Ledermann the CEO of Domus Academy, and Ronnie Jackson.

– Ambassadors are those people who represent the image of the Arab Fashion Council, only admitted through invitation by the higher management.

Activities
A landmark activity of the Arab Fashion Council is to organize the twice-yearly the prestigious event Arab Fashion Week. It is the only official Fashion Week in Dubai and the Arab World that is recognized on the international calendar next to the other big four fashion weeks, such as, New York Fashion Week, London Fashion Week, Milan Fashion Week, and Paris Fashion Week. The Arab Fashion Week represents all 22 Arabic countries and is hosted in Dubai at The Meydan Hotel, promoting both Arab and International designers into the global market where notable fashion brands show their Ready-Couture collection along to the Arab designers. On its 4th edition, the Arab Fashion Week became the world's main platform for the Pre-collections and Ready-Couture. The Arab Fashion Week has also been organised in Riyadh in April 2018 becoming the first fashion week in the history of Saudi Arabia.

On the 11th edition in June 2020 and the 12th edition in October 2020 the Arab Fashion Council hosted the Arab Fashion Week virtually as precaution to the spread of COVID-19.

In September 2020, the Arab Fashion Council hosted the first Arab designers showroom on the official calendar of Paris Fashion Week in partnership with the Fédération de la Haute Couture et de la Mode.

Similar Activities
Other fashion weeks similar to the event organized by the Arab Fashion Council are the New York Fashion Week, London Fashion Week, Milan Fashion Week and Paris Fashion Week.

Education
In partnership with leading fashion schools and UNESCO Office in Doha, the Arab Fashion Council promotes the Fashion Education and support the Arab talents by providing a fully covered scholarship for an Arab student after entering an annual competition to study bachelor's and master's degrees in Dubai.

Charity and peace
It is the first fashion association to work on a health and pension strategy to protect its members after reaching the age of 65. In addition, it tries to achieve peace in the Middle East through fashion inspired by the United States Federation for Middle East Peace.

The Arab Fashion Council has joined forces with Dubai Health Authority and Dubai Design District to launch #thread4cause, an initiative of which the Arab Fashion Council's members of designers, brands and companies have produced Personal Protection Equipment to support the health care sector amid the spread of COVID-19.

On 13 August 2020, and following the 2020 Beirut Explosion at the port of the city of Beirut, the capital of Lebanon which caused at least 204 deaths, 6,500 injuries, and US$15 billion in property damage, and leaving an estimated 300,000 people homeless, the Arab Fashion Council in partnership with the international fashion magazine Marie Claire Arabia has launched a charitable project titled Beirut Fashion Relief Initiative to aid and support the Lebanese fashion designers who were affected by the blast.

Countries covered by the Arab Fashion Council

See also
British Fashion Council
Council of Fashion Designers of America
National Chamber of Italian Fashion
Fédération française de la couture

References

Arab League
Fashion organizations